Michael Anthony McDonald (born February 6, 1965) is a Canadian retired heavyweight kickboxer. Nicknamed "The Black Sniper", he is the former three-time K-1 USA Grand Prix Champion.

Early life
Michael was born in Birmingham to a Jamaican family, he was raised in Mandeville, Jamaica until age ten when his family later immigrated to Canada, he grew up in Edmonton, Alberta during his school years. While growing up Michael was active in a variety of sports including track and field, football, soccer, baseball and wrestling. At the age of 17 a friend introduced him to Muay Thai.

K-1 career
In 1996 Michael entered the K-1 fighting network and started to train with the 1992 Karate World Cup Champion, Andy Hug. He stayed with "Team Andy" for 3 years fighting in the K-1 Grand Prix throughout the world.

In 2000 Michael stunned a crowd of 35,000 at the K-1 World Grand Prix 2000 in Fukuoka by winning a unanimous decision over the heavily favored Nicholas Pettas. In 2002, Michael won both K-1 tournaments held in that year in United States, K-1 USA Grand Prix 2002 and K-1 World Grand Prix 2002 in Las Vegas. On December 7, 2002 he was selected for K-1 World Grand Prix 2002 Finals first reserve fight against Martin Holm.

In 2004 he re-claimed the K-1 USA 2004 North American Grand Prix Championship. He was knocked down by Marvin Eastman in the first round of the quarter finals, but got up and dispatched his opponent with a KO in the second round. Scoring another second-round KO in the semi-final against Kelly Leo, McDonald advanced to the final. In front of a packed house of 6,000 fans at The Bellagio in Las Vegas, Michael dispatched Dewey Cooper to win the title for the third time in three years. The award was presented to McDonald by Muhammad Ali accompanied by Mike Tyson.

On August 12, 2006 he returned to Las Vegas for fifth time to re-claim the title. He won first two fights over Ariel Mastov and Imani Lee and reached the tournament finals once again but lost the title fight against Stefan Leko.

Mixed martial arts career
Michael has had two mixed martial arts fights, first against Lyoto Machida where he lost by submission (forearm choke) and next fight against fellow kickboxer Rick Roufus where he won by unanimous decision.

Titles

 2006 K-1 World Grand Prix in Las Vegas II Runner Up
 2004 K-1 World Grand Prix in Las Vegas I Champion
 2003 K-1 World Grand Prix in Las Vegas II Runner Up
 2002 K-1 World Grand Prix in Las Vegas Champion
 2002 K-1 World Grand Prix Preliminary USA Champion
 2001 K-1 World Grand Prix Preliminary USA Runner Up
 W.K.C. World Cruiser Weight Champion
 W.K.A. North American Heavyweight Champion
 Canadian Heavyweight Champion

Kickboxing record (Incomplete)

|-
|-  bgcolor="#CCFFCC"
| 2008-09-12 || Win ||align=left| Roman Kupcak || K-1 Slovakia 2008 || Bratislava, Slovakia || KO (Body Shot) || 4 || 1:53
|-
|-  bgcolor="#FFBBBB"
| 2008-06-25 || Loss ||align=left| Alain Ngalani || Planet Battle I || Hong Kong || Decision || 3 || 3:00
|-
|-  bgcolor="#FFBBBB"
| 2007-04-21 || Loss ||align=left| James McSweeney || Cage Rage 21 || London, England, UK || Decision (Majority) || 3 || 3:00
|-
|-  bgcolor="#FFBBBB"
| 2007-03-10 || Loss ||align=left| Petar Majstorovic || K-1 Fighting Network Croatia 2007 || Split, Croatia || TKO (Doctor Stoppage) || 5 || N/A
|-
|-  bgcolor="#FFBBBB"
| 2006-12-16 || Loss ||align=left| Zabit Samedov || K-1 Fighting Network Prague Round '07 || Prague, Czech Republic || TKO || 3 || N/A
|-
|-  bgcolor="#FFBBBB"
| 2006-08-12 || Loss ||align=left| Stefan Leko || K-1 World Grand Prix 2006 in Las Vegas II Final || Las Vegas, Nevada, USA || TKO (Doctor Stoppage) || 2 || 2:45
|-
! style=background:white colspan=9 |
|-
|-  bgcolor="#CCFFCC"
| 2006-08-12 || Win ||align=left| Imani Lee || K-1 World Grand Prix 2006 in Las Vegas II Semi Finals || Las Vegas, Nevada, USA || Decision (Unanimous) || 3 || 3:00
|-
|-  bgcolor="#CCFFCC"
| 2006-08-12 || Win ||align=left| Ariel Mastov || K-1 World Grand Prix 2006 in Las Vegas II Quarter Finals || Las Vegas, Nevada, USA || Decision (Unanimous) || 3 || 3:00
|-
|-  bgcolor="#FFBBBB"
| 2006-05-20 || Loss ||align=left| Magomed Magomedov || K-1 Scandinavia Grand Prix 2006 Quarter Finals || Stockholm, Sweden || Decision (Unanimous) || 3 || 3:00
|-
|-  bgcolor="#CCFFCC"
| 2006-04-29 || Win ||align=left| Ante Varnica || Confrontation in the Ring IV  || Split, Croatia || Decision (Split) || 3 || 3:00
|-
|-  bgcolor="#FFBBBB"
| 2005-08-13 || Loss ||align=left| Azem Maksutaj || K-1 World Grand Prix 2005 in Las Vegas II Quarter Finals || Las Vegas, Nevada, USA || Decision (Unanimous) || 3 || 3:00
|-
|-  bgcolor="#CCFFCC"
| 2005-05-21 || Win ||align=left| Azem Maksutaj || K-1 Scandinavia Grand Prix 2005 Quarter Finals || Stockholm, Sweden || Ext.R Decision (Majority) || 4 || 3:00
|-
! style=background:white colspan=9 |
|-
|-  bgcolor="#FFBBBB"
| 2004-11-06 || Loss ||align=left| Noboru Uchida || Titans 1st || Kitakyushu, Japan || Decision (Unanimous) || 3 || 3:00
|-
|-  bgcolor="#FFBBBB"
| 2004-09-25 || Loss ||align=left| Peter Aerts || K-1 World Grand Prix 2004 Final Elimination || Tokyo, Japan || Decision (Unanimous) || 3 || 3:00
|-
! style=background:white colspan=9 |
|-
|-  bgcolor="#CCFFCC"
| 2004-06-06 || Win ||align=left| Takeru || K-1 World Grand Prix 2004 in Nagoya || Nagoya, Japan || KO || 2 || 1:15
|-
|-  bgcolor="#CCFFCC"
| 2004-04-30 || Win ||align=left| Dewey Cooper || K-1 World Grand Prix 2004 in Las Vegas I Final || Las Vegas, Nevada, USA || Decision (Unanimous) || 3 || 3:00
|-
! style=background:white colspan=9 |
|-
|-  bgcolor="#CCFFCC"
| 2004-04-30 || Win ||align=left| Kelly Leo || K-1 World Grand Prix 2004 in Las Vegas I Semi Finals || Las Vegas, Nevada, USA || TKO || 1 || 2:09
|-
|-  bgcolor="#CCFFCC"
| 2004-04-30 || Win ||align=left| Marvin Eastman || K-1 World Grand Prix 2004 in Las Vegas I Quarter Finals || Las Vegas, Nevada, USA || TKO (2 Knockdowns) || 2 || 1:25
|-
|-  bgcolor="#c5d2ea"
| 2004-02-14 || Draw ||align=left| Larry Lindwall || K-1 Scandinavia 2004 World Qualification || Stockholm, Sweden || Draw || 3 || 3:00
|-
|-  bgcolor="#CCFFCC"
| 2003-12-31 || Win ||align=left| Hiromi Amada || Inoki Bom-Ba-Ye 2003 || Kobe, Japan || KO || 2 || 0:46
|-
|-  bgcolor="#FFBBBB"
| 2003-10-11 || Loss ||align=left| Bjorn Bregy || K-1 World Grand Prix 2003 Final Elimination Super Fight || Osaka, Japan || TKO (3 Knockdowns) || 1 || 2:50
|-
|-  bgcolor="#FFBBBB"
| 2003-08-15 || Loss ||align=left| Remy Bonjasky || K-1 World Grand Prix 2003 in Las Vegas II Final || Las Vegas, Nevada, USA || Ext.R Decision (Split) || 4 || 3:00
|-
! style=background:white colspan=9 |
|-
|-  bgcolor="#CCFFCC"
| 2003-08-15 || Win ||align=left| George Randolph || K-1 World Grand Prix 2003 in Las Vegas II Semi Finals || Las Vegas, Nevada, USA || KO (Left Hook) || 1 || 0:55
|-
|-  bgcolor="#CCFFCC"
| 2003-08-15 || Win ||align=left| Jefferson Silva || K-1 World Grand Prix 2003 in Las Vegas II Quarter Finals || Las Vegas, Nevada, USA || TKO (2 Knockdowns) || 2 || 2:22
|-
|-  bgcolor="#CCFFCC"
| 2003-07-13 || Win ||align=left| Gordan Jukić || K-1 World Grand Prix 2003 in Fukuoka || Fukuoka, Japan || TKO (Referee Stoppage) || 3 || 3:00
|-
|-  bgcolor="#FFBBBB"
| 2003-05-02 || Loss ||align=left| Carter Williams || K-1 World Grand Prix 2003 in Las Vegas Quarter Finals || Las Vegas, Nevada, USA || Decision (Split) || 3 || 3:00
|-
|-  bgcolor="#FFBBBB"
| 2002-12-07 || Loss ||align=left| Martin Holm || K-1 World Grand Prix 2002 Reserve Fight || Tokyo, Japan || Decision (Majority) || 3 || 3:00
|-
|-  bgcolor="#FFBBBB"
| 2002-10-05 || Loss ||align=left| Semmy Schilt || K-1 World Grand Prix 2002 in Las Vegas Final || Saitama, Japan || Decision (Unanimous) || 3 || 3:00
|-
! style=background:white colspan=9 |
|-
|-  bgcolor="#CCFFCC"
| 2002-08-17 || Win ||align=left| Pavel Majer || K-1 World Grand Prix 2002 in Las Vegas Final || Las Vegas, Nevada, USA || TKO || 2 || 1:01
|-
! style=background:white colspan=9 |
|-
|-  bgcolor="#CCFFCC"
| 2002-08-17 || Win ||align=left| Gregory Tony || K-1 World Grand Prix 2002 in Las Vegas Semi Finals || Las Vegas, Nevada, USA || Decision (Unanimous) || 3 || 3:00
|-
|-  bgcolor="#CCFFCC"
| 2002-08-17 || Win ||align=left| Ricardo Duenas || K-1 World Grand Prix 2002 in Las Vegas Quarter Finals || Las Vegas, Nevada, USA || KO || 1 || 1:25
|-
|-  bgcolor="#CCFFCC"
| 2002-05-03 || Win ||align=left| Rick Roufus || K-1 World Grand Prix 2002 Preliminary USA Final || Las Vegas, Nevada, USA || Ext.R TKO (Corner Stoppage) || 4 || 3:00
|-
! style=background:white colspan=9 |
|-
|-  bgcolor="#CCFFCC"
| 2002-05-03 || Win ||align=left| Jeff Ford || K-1 World Grand Prix 2002 Preliminary USA Semi Finals || Las Vegas, Nevada, USA || TKO (Injury) || 2 || 2:00
|-
|-  bgcolor="#CCFFCC"
| 2002-05-03 || Win ||align=left| Giuseppe DeNatale || K-1 World Grand Prix 2002 Preliminary USA Quarter Finals || Las Vegas, Nevada, USA || TKO || 3 || 2:00
|-
|-  bgcolor="#CCFFCC"
| 2001-10-08 || Win ||align=left| Glaube Feitosa || K-1 World Grand Prix 2001 in Fukuoka || Fukuoka, Japan || Decision (Unanimous) || 3 || 3:00
|-
|-  bgcolor="#FFBBBB"
| 2001-06-16 || Loss ||align=left| Matt Skelton || K-1 World Grand Prix 2001 in Melbourne Semi Finals || Melbourne, Australia || Decision (Unanimous) || 3 || 3:00
|-
|-  bgcolor="#CCFFCC"
| 2001-06-16 || Win ||align=left| Mirko Cro Cop || K-1 World Grand Prix 2001 in Melbourne Quarter Finals || Melbourne, Australia || TKO (Referee Stoppage) || 1 || 1:24
|-
|-  bgcolor="#FFBBBB"
| 2001-05-05 || Loss ||align=left| Maurice Smith || K-1 World Grand Prix 2001 Preliminary USA Final || Las Vegas, Nevada, USA || Ext.R Decision (Split) || 4 || 3:00
|-
! style=background:white colspan=9 |
|-
|-  bgcolor="#CCFFCC"
| 2001-05-05 || Win ||align=left| Jeff Roufus || K-1 World Grand Prix 2001 Preliminary USA Semi Finals || Las Vegas, Nevada, USA || Decision (Unanimous) || 3 || 3:00
|-
|-  bgcolor="#CCFFCC"
| 2001-05-05 || Win ||align=left| Jean-Claude Leuyer || K-1 World Grand Prix 2001 Preliminary USA Quarter Finals || Las Vegas, Nevada, USA || Decision (Split) || 3 || 3:00
|-
|-  bgcolor="#FFBBBB"
| 2001-03-17 || Loss ||align=left| Ron Belliveau || K-1 Gladiators 2001 || Yokohama, Japan || KO (Right Hook) || 1 || 1:56
|-
|-  bgcolor="#CCFFCC"
| 2000-10-09 || Win ||align=left| Nicholas Pettas || K-1 World Grand Prix 2000 in Fukuoka || Fukuoka, Japan || Decision (Unanimous) || 5 || 3:00
|-
|-  bgcolor="#CCFFCC"
| 2000-08-20 || Win ||align=left| Phil Fagan || K-1 World Grand Prix 2000 in Yokohama || Yokohama, Japan || TKO || 2 || 1:05
|-
|-  bgcolor="#FFBBBB"
| 1999-07-18 || Loss ||align=left| Zijad Poljo || K-1 Dream '99 Quarter Finals || Nagoya, Japan || Decision (Unanimous) || 3 || 3:00
|-
|-  bgcolor="#CCFFCC"
| 1999-06-05 || Win ||align=left| Michael Thompson || K-1 Fight Night '99 || Zürich, Switzerland || Decision (Unanimous) || 5 || 3:00
|-
|-  bgcolor="#FFBBBB"
| 1999-02-03 || Loss ||align=left| Peter Aerts || K-1 Rising Sun '99 || Tokyo, Japan || KO (Left Low Kick) || 2 || 2:40
|-
|-  bgcolor="#CCFFCC"
| 1998-08-28 || Win ||align=left| Carl Bernardo || K-1 Japan Grand Prix '98 || Tokyo, Japan || TKO (Referee Stoppage) || 1 || 0:34
|-
! style=background:white colspan=9 |
|-
|-  bgcolor="#FFBBBB"
| 1995-08-25 || Loss ||align=left| Ray Sefo || N/A || Auckland, New Zealand || KO (Right Hook) || 3 || N/A
|-
! style=background:white colspan=9 |
|-
|-  bgcolor="#FFBBBB"
| 1994-01-22 || Loss ||align=left| Rick Roufus || N/A || Tahoe, Nevada, USA || KO || 1 || 0:43
|-
! style=background:white colspan=9 |
|-
! style=background:white colspan=9 |
|-
|-  bgcolor="#FFBBBB"
| 1993-06-22 || Loss ||align=left| Marek Piotrowski || P.K.A. Karatemania 6 || Montreal, Canada || TKO || 11 || N/A
|-
! style=background:white colspan=9 |
|-
|-  bgcolor="#FFBBBB"
| 1989-02-19 || Loss ||align=left| Thorne || N/A || Amsterdam, Netherlands || KO || 1 || N/A
|-
|-  bgcolor="#CCFFCC"
| 1988-02-27 || Win ||align=left| Coswal || Superfights I || Amsterdam, Netherlands || Decision || 5 || 2:00
|-
|-  bgcolor="#FFBBBB"
| 1988 || Loss ||align=left| Milton Felter || N/A || Amsterdam, Netherlands || Decision || 5 || N/A
|-
|-  bgcolor="#CCFFCC"
| 1986 || Win ||align=left| Darryl Weinberger || N/A || Regina, Canada || KO || 1 || 0:30
|-
! style=background:white colspan=9 |
|-
|-
| colspan=9 | Legend:

See also
List of K-1 events
List of male kickboxers

References

External links
Profile at K-1

Living people
1965 births
Canadian male kickboxers
Light heavyweight kickboxers
Cruiserweight kickboxers
Heavyweight kickboxers
Canadian Muay Thai practitioners
Black Canadian mixed martial artists
Canadian male mixed martial artists
Light heavyweight mixed martial artists
Mixed martial artists utilizing Muay Thai
Sportspeople from Edmonton
Jamaican emigrants to Canada
Canadian people of English descent